Corridors of Genon is a first-person maze video game for the ZX Spectrum developed by New Generation Software and released in 1983.

Reception
Crash: "An unusually addictive game for those who don't mind a bit of figuring" 72/100

Personal Computer Games: "The 3D graphics are up to New Generations usual high standard and the sound is also very well used.  But I would say the game lacks the sort of variation which has made games like Arcadia and Manic Miner such big hits" 5/10 

Sinclair User: "Corridors of Genon is an excellent 3D game from a master of 3D techniques.  We cannot recommend it too highly"

References

External links
 
 Gameplay video at YouTube

1983 video games
Europe-exclusive video games
Maze games
New Generation Software games
Video games developed in the United Kingdom
ZX Spectrum games
ZX Spectrum-only games